Trecia Roberts (born 4 February 1971 in Bangkok, Krung Thep Maha Nakhon) is a Thai 100 metres hurdles runner. She was born to a Thai mother and an African-American father.

She competed for the United States up to and including the 1999 indoor season, but represented Thailand at the 1999 World Championships.

She won the silver medal at the 2000 Asian Championships and bronze medals at the Asian Championships in 2002 and 2003 as well as the 2002 Asian Games, where she also helped win a silver medal in 4 x 100 metres relay. She finished sixth at the 2006 Asian Games.

She also competed at the World Championships in 1999, 2001, 2003 and 2005, the World Indoor Championships in 2001 and the Olympic Games in 2000 and 2004 without reaching the final.

Her personal best time is 12.73 seconds, achieved in July 1998 in Flagstaff. She competed for the United States at the time, but later set a Thai record of 12.83 seconds.

Competition record

References

External links
 
sports-reference

1971 births
Living people
Trecia Roberts
Trecia Roberts
American female hurdlers
Athletes (track and field) at the 2000 Summer Olympics
Athletes (track and field) at the 2004 Summer Olympics
Trecia Roberts
Asian Games medalists in athletics (track and field)
Athletes (track and field) at the 2002 Asian Games
Athletes (track and field) at the 2006 Asian Games
Trecia Roberts
Trecia Roberts
Southeast Asian Games medalists in athletics
Trecia Roberts
Trecia Roberts
Medalists at the 2002 Asian Games
Competitors at the 2001 Southeast Asian Games
Competitors at the 2003 Southeast Asian Games
Competitors at the 2005 Southeast Asian Games
21st-century American women
Trecia Roberts